In geology, ripple marks are sedimentary structures (i.e., bedforms of the lower flow regime) and indicate agitation by water (current or waves) or wind.

Defining ripple cross-laminae and asymmetric ripples 

 Current ripple marks, unidirectional ripples, or asymmetrical ripple marks are asymmetrical in profile, with a gentle up-current slope and a steeper down-current slope.  The down-current slope is the angle of repose, which depends on the shape of the sediment.  These commonly form in fluvial and aeolian depositional environments, and are a signifier of the lower part of the Lower Flow Regime.
 Ripple cross-laminae forms when deposition takes place during migration of current or wave ripples.  A series of cross-laminae are produced by superimposing migrating ripples.  The ripples form lateral to one another, such that the crests of vertically succeeding laminae are out of phase and appear to be advancing upslope.  This process results in cross-bedded units that have the general appearance of waves in outcrop sections cut normal to the wave crests.  In sections with other orientations, the laminae may appear horizontal or trough-shaped, depending upon the orientation and the shape of the ripples.  Ripple cross-laminae will always have a steeper dip downstream, and will always be perpendicular to paleoflow meaning the orientation of the ripples will be in a direction that is ninety degrees to the direction that current if flowing.  Scientists suggest current drag, or the slowing of current velocity, during deposition is responsible for ripple cross-laminae.

Ripple marks in different environments

Wave-formed ripples

 Also called bidirectional ripples, or symmetrical ripple marks have a symmetrical, almost sinusoidal profile; they indicate an environment with weak currents where water motion is dominated by wave oscillations.
 In most present-day streams, ripples will not form in sediment larger than coarse sand. Therefore, the stream beds of sand-bed streams are dominated by current ripples, while gravel-bed streams do not contain bedforms. The internal structure of ripples is a base of fine sand with coarse grains deposited on top since the size distribution of sand grains correlates to the size of the ripples. This occurs because the fine grains continue to move while the coarse grains accumulate and provide a protective barrier.

Ripple marks formed by aeolian processes

Normal ripples Also known as impact ripples, these occur in the lower part of the lower flow regime sands with grain sizes between 0.3-2.5 mm and normal ripples form wavelengths of 7-14 cm. Normal ripples have straight or slightly sinuous crests approximately transverse to the direction of the wind.

Megaripples These occur in the upper part of the lower flow regime where sand with bimodal particle size distribution forms unusually long wavelength of 1-25 m where the wind is not strong enough to move the larger particles but strong enough to move the smaller grains by saltation.

Transverse aeolian ridges There is some thought that transverse aeolian ridges are a form of fossilized ripple, but there is no conclusive evidence so far.

Fluid drag ripples Also known as aerodynamic ripples, these are formed with fine, well-sorted grain particles accompanied by high velocity winds which result in long, flat ripples. The flat ripples are formed by long saltation paths taken by grains in suspension and grains on the ground surface.

Definitions 

Crest The point on a wave with the maximum value or height.  It is the location at the peak of the wave cycle as shown in picture to the right.

Trough The opposite of a crest, so the minimum value or height in a wave.  It is the location at the very lowest point of a wave cycle also shown in picture to right.

Lee The lee side has a steeper slope than the stoss.  The lee is always on the back side of the ripple, which is also on the opposite side of where the current flow meets the ripple.  The current flows down the lee side.

Stoss The stoss is the side of a wave or ripple that has a gentle slope versus a steeper slope.  Current always flows up the stoss side and down the lee side.  This can be used to determine current flow during the time of ripple formation.

See also
 Capillary wave
 Giant current ripples
Hertha Ayrton - pioneer in description of how ripples formed
 Water on Mars - sedimentary ripple marks show indirect evidence of ancient water flows on our neighbor planet
Transverse aeolian ridges - mysterious fossilized features on Mars that resemble giant ripples
 Washboarding - ripples on dirt roads formed by the interaction of vehicle wheels with the gravel and sediment

References
 Easterbrook, Don J. Surface processes and landforms. Upper Saddle River, N.J: Prentice Hall, 1999. Print.  pp. 479-480.
 Greeley, Ronald, and James D. Iversen. Wind as a Geological Process On Earth, Mars, Venus and Titan (Cambridge Planetary Science Old). New York: Cambridge UP, 1987.  pp. 153-154
 Monroe, James S., and Reed Wicander. The Changing Earth: Exploring Geology and Evolution, 2nd ed. Belmont: West Publishing Company, 1997.  pp. 114-15, 352.

External links

 Ripple Marks and Uniformitarianism
 Unidirectional flow: Sand ripples and grain distribution 2D model
 Unidirectional flow: Sand ripples and topography 2D model
 Waves: Sand ripples and grain distribution 2D model
 Waves: Sand ripples and topography 2D model

Sedimentary structures
Patterned grounds